Carlos Espeleta (born April 22, 1985 or March 21, 1984) is an Argentine weightlifter. His personal best is 317.5 kg.

He competed in Weightlifting at the 2008 Summer Olympics in the 77 kg division finishing nineteenth with 310 kg.

He is 5 ft 11 inches tall and weighs 170 lb.

Notes and references

External links
NBC profile
  at beijing2008

Argentine male weightlifters
Living people
Weightlifters at the 2008 Summer Olympics
Olympic weightlifters of Argentina
1985 births
20th-century Argentine people
21st-century Argentine people